Pseudiberus chentingensis is a species of air-breathing land snail, a terrestrial pulmonate gastropod mollusk in the family Bradybaenidae.

Subspecies
 Pseudiberus chentingensis latispira Yen, 1935

Distribution
This species is found in China. The type locality is Zhengding (Changing), in Hebei Province.

Description
The shell has 4.5–5 whorls. The width of the shell is 19.4–22.3 mm, and the height of the shell is 9.7–11.1 mm.

The width of the shell of Pseudiberus chentingensis latispira is 14.1–21 mm. The height of the shell of Pseudiberus chentingensis latispira is 7.1–12.3 mm.

References

Further reading

 Yen T. C. (1935). "The non-marine gastropods of North China. Part I." Publications du Musée Hoangho Paiho de Tien Tsin 34: 1–57.

Bradybaenidae
Gastropods described in 1935